Charles William Alderson (June 21, 1846 – March 23, 1914) was an American politician who served in the Virginia House of Delegates.

References

External links 

Democratic Party members of the Virginia House of Delegates
19th-century American politicians
1846 births
1914 deaths